Almita is a genus of moths of the family Crambidae.

Species
Almita portalia B. Landry, 1995
Almita texana B. Landry, 1995

References

Crambini
Crambidae genera